Impera (stylized in all caps) is the fifth studio album by the Swedish rock band Ghost. Released on 11 March 2022, it was produced by Klas Åhlund who also produced the band's 2015 album, Meliora. The release of Impera was preceded by three singles: the first, "Hunter's Moon", was released on 30 September 2021 in support of the 2021 slasher film Halloween Kills with a version being a part of the film's closing credits; the second single, "Call Me Little Sunshine", was released on 20 January 2022 and the third, "Twenties", was released on 2 March 2022. 

The theme of Impera mainly focuses on "the rise and fall of empires". The album received widespread critical acclaim.

Background and release
In a 2021 interview with radio station KLAQ, frontman Tobias Forge stated that he came up with the concept of Impera in 2013 after reading the book The Rule of Empires: Those Who Built Them, Those Who Endured Them, and Why They Always Fall by Timothy Parsons. He came across the book in an independent bookstore called Left Bank Books, situated in Seattle's Pike Place Market. When asked about that chance discovery, he explained: "I'm interested in history and culture, and how empires are built up, and how and why they always fall apart. Right there and then, I knew that at some point, 'I'm going to make an imperial record.'"

In June 2019, Forge stated that the band would be touring the United States in September and October in support of their fourth album Prequelle before returning to Europe. The band then entered the studio in January 2020 to begin working on their fifth album, and planned to release it by late summer that year. However, Forge stated that they would wait to until after the U.S. presidential election to release the album, concerning the event would draw public's attention the most.

In March 2020, during their final show supporting their 2018 album Prequelle in Mexico City, Ghost introduced a new character Papa Emeritus IV. He is expected to play a role in their fifth album and its accompanied tour.

The COVID-19 pandemic delayed the release of the album, and in October 2020, Forge revealed that the album was intended to be released in the winter. It was further delayed, however.

On 30 September 2021, the band released a single, "Hunter's Moon" for the 2021 slasher film Halloween Kills with a different version of the song being played in the closing credits. On 20 January 2022, the band announced their fifth studio album, Impera, was finally set to release on 11 March 2022, and released what would be the second single, "Call Me Little Sunshine", as "Hunter's Moon" will also appear on the album. On 2 March 2022, the band released the next single from the album, "Twenties". On 27 July 2022, the band released a music video for the album's fourth single, "Spillways".

A download of the studio version of the song "Kaisarion" was made available with a preorder of a special edition CD of Impera.

Recording
While it was originally planned for the band to record the album in 2020 and release it in early 2021, the band ended up waiting until January 2021 to enter the studio and record the album. Recording lasted six weeks and mixing/mastering took two to three weeks. The album was produced by Klas Åhlund and mixed by Andy Wallace, who also did the same for the band's 2015 album, Meliora.

Music and themes
Musically, Impera has been described as hard rock, arena rock, glam metal, heavy metal, and pop rock. The album's sound has been described as 1980s-style pop and rock and has been compared to ABBA, Boston, Dio, Bon Jovi, and Def Leppard. The album is themed mainly on "the rise and fall of empires". It is described to take place hundreds of years forward from the 14th century Europe Black Plague era of Ghost's previous album, Prequelle.

The cover art by Zbigniew Bielak is a reference to a photograph of English occultist Aleister Crowley.

Promotion
In January 2022, the band kicked off a North American co-headline tour with Volbeat called the Imperatour. During the first show in Reno, the band performed "Kaisarion", the second song of the album, for the first time, as well as introduced new steampunk-inspired costumes for the Nameless Ghouls. They also headlined the UK and European legs of the tour that started in April 2022.

The band appeared on U.S. chat show Jimmy Kimmel Live! on 17 March 2022, where they performed the single "Call Me Little Sunshine".

Commercial performance 
Impera debuted at number one in five countries, including in the band's native country Sweden, and charted in the top 40 of multiple charts worldwide.

In the United States, Impera debuted at number two on the Billboard 200 chart, behind Lil Durk's 7220, selling 70,000 units in its first week, of which 62,500  were physical album sales. It is Ghost's highest charting album in the U.S., surpassing Prequelles position of number three, as well as earning the largest physical album sales week of 2022 in the U.S. It also charted at number 2 in the UK, becoming Ghost's highest charting album there, behind Rex Orange County's Who Cares?

Reception

Impera received critical acclaim upon its release. At Metacritic, which assigns a normalized rating out of 100 to reviews from mainstream publications, the album received an average score of 84, which indicates "universal acclaim", based on 8 reviews.

Thom Jurek of AllMusic was positive towards the album stating, "Impera is the most unabashed exercise in exultant pop/rock sheen Ghost has issued to date; it establishes an exquisite front in their own quest for global rock domination." Dom Lawson of Blabbermouth.net called the album the "most spectacular and hook-filled heavy(ish) metal albums in recent memory." According to Mark Beaumont of Classic Rock, "Ghost swap Medieval demons for modern-day counterparts..." and compared the album to Green Day's American Idiot.

Manus Hopkins of Exclaim! called the album "more thematically interesting and more musically complex album than its predecessor" but was less positive towards the band's departure from themes of devil-worshiping and a more evil image. James Hickie of Kerrang! stated that "Impera is among Ghost's very best and sure to push them even closer to those heavenly heights." According to Dave Everley of Metal Hammer, "Ghost have turned in a modern metal classic with an arena rock heart. It turns out the devil doesn't have all the best tunes. Tobias Forge does."

Jordan Blum of Metal Injection considered the album to be "a tad more accessible and light compared to their first two or three albums—prioritizing welcoming rock over weird metal in most cases—but that's hardly a flaw considering how unified and exciting it is." Metal Sucks compared the album to Avatar and King Diamond and called it "theatrical, catchy, and evil in the most approachable way." James McMahon of NME called the twelve tracks on the album "a truly delicious pop-rock proposition." Adrien Begrand  of PopMatters considered the lyrics on the song "Twenties" to be too blunt and bring the song "close to a cartoon level." However, Begrand praised the album's "smart riffs and melodies" and considers the album to be what "establishes them as a commercial hard rock force."

Accolades

Track listing

Personnel
Credits for Impera adapted from liner notes.

Ghost
 Papa Emeritus IV
 A Group of Nameless Ghouls

Additional personnel
 Fredrik Åkesson – guitars
 Hux Nettermalm – drums
 Martin Hederos – piano, organ
 Alva Åkesson – choir (8)
 Elvira Nettermalm – choir (8)
 Inez Johansson – choir (8)
 Lita Åhlund – choir (8)
 Minou Forge – choir (8)
 Olivia Boman – choir (8)
 Anna Mosten – choir (9, 12)
 Estherlivia – choir (9, 12)
 Ida Gratte – choir (9, 12)
 Ida Johansson – choir (9, 12)
 Jade Ell – choir (9, 12)
 Johanna Eriksson Sanmark – choir (9, 12)

Technical
 Klas Åhlund – production
 Andy Wallace – mixing
 Zbigniew Bielak – cover art
 Ted Jensen – mastering

Charts

Weekly charts

Year-end charts

Certifications

Release history

References

2022 albums
Ghost (Swedish band) albums
Albums produced by Klas Åhlund
Albums postponed due to the COVID-19 pandemic